The Estadio Gunther Vogel is a football stadium in  the city of San Lorenzo, Paraguay. It is the home venue of Club Sportivo San Lorenzo, it has a capacity of 5,000 spectators.

The stadium was known until 2011 as "Ciudad Universitaria".

Gunther Vogel
Sports venues completed in 1940
1940 establishments in Paraguay